The Instituto Nacional de Colonização e Reforma Agrária - INCRA (National Institute for Colonization and Agrarian Reform) is a federal government authority of the public administration of Brazil. INCRA administers the land reform issues.

External links 
 
 
 

Government agencies of Brazil
Land reform
Executive branch of Brazil
Government agencies established in 1970
1970 establishments in Brazil